Knowing Men is a 1930 British romantic comedy film directed by Elinor Glyn and starring Carl Brisson, Elissa Landi and Helen Haye. It was made at Elstree Studios and based on one of Glyn's own novels. Originally shot using an experimental colour system, it was eventually released in plain black-and-white.

Cast
 Carl Brisson as George Vere  
 Elissa Landi as Korah Harley  
 Helen Haye as Marquise de Jarmais  
 C. M. Hallard as Marquis de Jarnais  
 Henry Mollison as Frank Bramber  
 Thomas Weguelin as Michelet  
 Marjorie Loring as Blanche 
 Jeanne De Casalis as Delphine  
 David Herbert

References

Bibliography
 Low, Rachael. Filmmaking in 1930s Britain. George Allen & Unwin, 1985.
 Wood, Linda. British Films, 1927-1939. British Film Institute, 1986.

External links

1930 films
1930s color films
British romantic comedy films
1930 romantic comedy films
1930s English-language films
Films shot at British International Pictures Studios
Films based on British novels
1930s British films